Pumari Chhish, (or Pumarikish, Peak 11) is a high peak in the Shimshal Valley, a village of the Karakoram range. It lies about 4 km east of Khunyang Chhish, in the heart of the Hispar, north of the Hispar Glacier.

Pumari Chhish was first attempted by an Austrian group in 1974, who failed to climb or bypass the Yazghil Glacier on the north side of the peak. In 1979, a Japanese group from the Hokkaido Alpine Association and Pakistani Army officer of 29 signal  succeeded in climbing the mountain via a long route starting from the Khunyang Glacier, well to the west of the peak. They first had to cross a significant col to access the upper Yazghil Glacier; they then ascended the north ridge of Pumari Chhish.

According to the Himalayan Index, there have been no other successful ascents of Pumari Chhish.

Pumari Chhish South
About  to the southeast of the main summit of Pumari Chhish lies Pumari Chhish South, . After two unsuccessful attempts on this peak in 1999 and 2000 by Julie-Ann Clyma and Roger Payne, it was first climbed on June 12, 2007, by Yannick Graziani and Christian Trommsdorff. Among first ascents of peaks over 7000 metres, their  climb was highly technical (they rate it ABO 5.10 M6 A1). They made the ascent in pure alpine style over six days. Their achievement earned them the lead article in the 2008 American Alpine Journal.

References

Seven-thousanders of the Karakoram
Mountains of Gilgit-Baltistan